Robley Dunglison Evans (May 18, 1907, University Place, Nebraska – December 31, 1995, Paradise Valley, Arizona) was an American nuclear physicist and pioneer of nuclear medicine. He was the president of the Health Physics Society in 1972–1973.

Biography
His father Manley Jefferson Evans (1878–1970) and mother Alice Jennie Turner (1882–1965) married in August 1905 in O'Neill, Nebraska. Manley J. Evans was a professor at Nebraska Wesleyan University. Robley D. Evans was their only child. He is named in honor of Admiral Robley D. Evans, but there is no immediate family connection. In 1912 the family moved to Los Angeles County. Manley J. Evans taught at Hollywood High School for 32 years. At Hollywood High School, Robley D. Evans was the president of the science club and the valedictorian of the Class of 1925. In the 8th grade, even before he entered high school, he was playing percussion instruments professionally in danceable jazz bands. In high school he played in the regular band and sometimes in orchestra, symphony, and the Hollywood Bowl.

Evans studied physics at California Institute of Technology (Caltech) and graduated with a bachelor's degree in 1928, a master's degree in 1929. and a PhD in 1932. His thesis advisor was Robert Andrews Millikan. Evans's thesis concerned the measurement of "background radiation coming from the earth, so that it could be distinguished from cosmic radiation." He married his first wife, Gwendolyn Elizabeth Aldrich (1905–1989), in 1928. From 1932 to 1934 he was a National Research Council Fellow at the University of California, Berkeley.

He accepted a job offer at Massachusetts Institute of Technology (MIT) and he drove, with his wife Gwen, their first son Richard, and their adopted daughter Nadia, from California to Massachusetts in the summer of 1934. Robley Evans in 1934 taught MIT's (and the USA's) first course in nuclear physics. At MIT, he was an assistant professor from 1934 to 1938, an associate professor from 1938 to 1945, and a full professor from 1945 to 1972, when he retired as professor emeritus. In 1935 he established MIT's Radioactivity Center (a multidisciplinary endeavor) and directed it until his retirement in 1972. After retiring from the MIT faculty, he was a consultant at MIT and at the Mayo Clinic. He was the author or co-author of more than 200 scientific articles.

In the early 1930s he developed the meter-arc method (sometimes called the Evans method).

Evans was one of the world's first scientists to investigate radium's effects on human health.
He did research on the radium exposure of former workers (called Radium Girls) who applied radioactive luminescent paint to clock faces and were instructed to form pointed tips on the paint brushes by applying moisture from their lips. He also did research on health problems caused by ill-advised use, in the 1920s, of radium in medicine, tonics, body adornment, or amusing novelty. The notorious case of Eben Byers, who died in March 1932, after taking over 1,000 doses of Radithor, received considerable publicity and alerted the general public to the dangers of radioactive substances.

In 1938 Evans instigated and chaired the Conference on Applied Nuclear Physics, which was held in October 1940 and was jointedly sponsored by MIT and the American Institute of Physics. In 1938 he was the director for the construction of MIT's Markle Cyclotron, which became operational in 1939, and produced radioisotopes that were sent to dozens of medical research centers and companies. The cyclotron was operational for about 3 decades. The cyclotron's first product was iodine-130, which, with a half-life of 12 hours, was far more useful medicinally than iodine-128, which had a half-life of 25 minutes. For many years, physicians and researchers have used iodine-131, which has an even longer half-life of about 8 days.

In May 1941, Evans and the USA's other leading experts on the safe handling of radioactive materials held a one-day meeting at the National Bureau of Standards. He presented all of the data to the group of experts and suggested a maximum permissible body burden of 0.1 microcuries of radium. He individually asked each of the experts, including Gioacchino Failla, Leon Francis Curtiss (1985–1983), and Harrison Stanford Martland (1883–1954), for their opinions. All agreed with Evans's suggestion. Evans and Clark Goodman also established maximum permissible air concentrations for radon.

During WW II he worked with colleagues at MIT's Radioactivity Center and with physicians from the Medical Clinic of the Peter Bent Brigham Hospital and from Harvard Medical School to develop a technique for preserving human whole blood to benefit wounded military men.

In a January 1946 article published in The Atlantic Monthly, Evans summarized various medical applications of nuclear physics.

On his initiative, the Center for Human Radiobiology was established by the Atomic Energy Commission at Argonne National Laboratory to study the long-term effects of radium exposure.

Evans was also one of the most important pioneers of setting safety standards for the transportation of radioactive materials. From 1946 to 1969 he chaired a National Research Council committee on the transport of radioactive materials that created basic standards.

His doctoral students include Martin Deutsch.

Evans was elected a fellow of the American Physical Society in 1936 and of the American Academy of Arts and Sciences in 1945. He was also a fellow of the American Association for the Advancement of Science (AAAS), the New York Academy of Sciences, the American Association of Physics Teachers, and the American Nuclear Society. In 1990 he received the Enrico Fermi Award for "pioneering work in nuclear medicine, in measurements of body burdens of radioactivity and their effects on human health, and in the use of radioactive isotopes for medical purposes." He received the Presidential Certificate of Merit, the Theobald Smith Medal and Award in Medicine of the AAAS, the Hull Award and Gold Medal of the American Medical Association, the Silvanus Thompson Medal of the British Institute of Radiology, the Distinguished Achievement Award of the Health Physics Society, and the William D. Coolidge Award of the American Association of Physicists in Medicine in 1984.

Upon his death he was survived by his second wife and his three children from his first marriage.

The Columbia Chapter of the Health Physics Society (CCHPS) annually awards the Robley D. Evans Commemorative Medal.

Selected publications

Articles
 
 
 
 
 
 
 
 
 
 
 
 
 
 
 
 
  (over 200 citations)
 
 
 
 
 
 
 
 
 
  1952 (over 600 citations)

Books
  (For more than 2 decades this book was a basic text for graduate students in nuclear physics.)
  (This pamphlet is a practical manual on teaching and was translated into several languages. More than 100,000 copies have been sold.)

References

External links
 
 
 

1907 births
1995 deaths
American biophysicists
American nuclear physicists
Health physicists
Medical physicists
California Institute of Technology alumni
Massachusetts Institute of Technology faculty
Fellows of the American Academy of Arts and Sciences
Fellows of the American Association for the Advancement of Science
Fellows of the American Physical Society